George William Gore (July 11, 1901- September 13, 1982) was President of Florida A & M University from 1950 to 1968, FAMU's second longest serving president after John Robert Edward Lee. He oversaw the institution's transition from Florida A&M College (FAMCEE) to Florida A&M University and resisted an encouraged merge with Florida State University. The Gore Education Complex at FAMU, and the nearby street, Gore Avenue, are named for him.

Gore received a bachelor's degree in English and journalism from DePauw. He then earned a master's from Harvard and A Ph.D. from Columbia.  He joined the faculty of Tennessee A&I as a journalism instructor and later spent 23 years as dean before coming to FAMU.  While at Tennessee he conceived of the idea of Alpha Kappa Mu honor society.

Personal life
Gore was born in Nashville, Tennessee, in 1901. He was married to Pearl Mayo Winrow. They had one daughter, also named Pearl.

References

Presidents of Florida A&M University
1901 births
1982 deaths
African-American educators
Tennessee State University faculty
DePauw University alumni
Harvard University alumni
Columbia University alumni
20th-century African-American people
20th-century American academics